The Petit Baronetcy, of Petit Hall on the Island of Bombay, is a title in the Baronetage of the United Kingdom. It was created on 1 September 1890 for the Indian entrepreneur and philanthropist Dinshaw Maneckji Petit.

The baronetcy was created with remainder to Framjee Petit, second son of the first Baronet, and the heirs male of his body, failing which to the heirs male of the body of the first Baronet. By Special Act of the Legislative Council of India, all holders of the title were to relinquish their own name upon succession and assume the name of the first Baronet.

The family's arms display the slogan, Consequitur quod cunque petit, translated as He obtains whatever he asks.

Petit Baronets, of Petit Hall (1890)
Sir Dinshaw Maneckji Petit, 1st Baronet (1823–1901)
Sir Dinshaw Maneckji Petit, 2nd Baronet (1873–1933). His daughter, Rattanbai, married Jinnah and was the mother of Dina Wadia
Sir Dinshaw Maneckji Petit, 3rd Baronet (1901–1983). His wife, Sylla, was a sister of JRD Tata.
Sir Dinshaw Maneckji Petit, 4th Baronet (1934–1998)
Sir Dinshaw Maneckji Petit, 5th Baronet (born 1965)

Other family members
 Sylla Tata, wife of the 3rd Baronet. She was the daughter of Tata Group chairman Ratanji Dadabhoy Tata, the sister of JRD Tata, and the sister-in-law of Rattanbai Petit (see below).
 Rattanbai Petit (1900–1929), daughter of the 2nd Baronet. She married Muhammad Ali Jinnah, the founder of Pakistan.
 Dina Wadia (1919–2017), daughter of Muhammad Ali Jinnah and Rattanbai Petit. She was married to Bombay Dyeing chairman Neville Wadia, son of Sir Ness Waida and Lady Evelyne Clara Powell Wadia.

See also
Jinnah family
Tata family
Wadia family

References

Kidd, Charles, Williamson, David (editors). Debrett's Peerage and Baronetage (1990 edition). New York: St Martin's Press, 1990.

Petit
Baronetcies created with special remainders
Indian baronets
1890 establishments in India